Liam Mark Kelly (born 10 February 1990) is a professional footballer who plays as a midfielder for EFL Championship club Coventry City.

As a youth player Kelly played for Milton Keynes Dons, but did not make a professional appearance before leaving in 2008. Following his departure he moved to Scotland to play for Kilmarnock where he stayed for 4 seasons until a transfer to EFL Championship club Bristol City. Kelly struggled with injury in Bristol, and only managed 21 appearances in two years with the team before moving to Oldham Athletic. He was made captain at Oldham and played there for two years until July 2016 when Leyton Orient made him their new club record signing. Orient finished bottom of League Two in Kelly's first season, and he left the club in the summer to join Coventry. Kelly currently captains the Coventry side, having made over 100 appearances and contributed to two promotions during his tenure at the club.

Club career

Milton Keynes Dons
Kelly began his career at Milton Keynes Dons. At the end of the 2007–08 season, he left the club with a number of other young players when a promised one-year contract was withdrawn, as the club could no longer afford them.

Kilmarnock
Kelly made his first appearance for Kilmarnock as a substitute in a match against Hamilton Academical on 26 January 2010. This was quickly followed by his first start, in a 4–4 draw with Dundee United four days later. On 6 February, he scored his first professional goal in a 3–0 Scottish Cup fifth round win against Inverness Caledonian Thistle. On 24 March 2010, Kelly provide his first assist to let Chris Maguire score the only goal for Kilmarnock in the match as they lost 2–1 to Hamilton Academical. On 5 May 2010, Kelly scored his first professional league goal in the 69th minute of a 2–1 victory over Aberdeen.

In the 2010–11 season, Kelly provided his first assist of the season for David Silva to score in a 2–1 loss against Hibernian. Kelly scored his first goal of the season and second league goal of his career in a 3–0 win over St Johnstone on 6 November 2010. Kelly signed a two-and-a-half-year contract with Kilmarnock on 17 December 2010. A day later, Kelly scored both goals for Kilmarnock as they won 2–1 against Hibernian at Rugby Park. Following the match, manager Mixu Paatelainen praised his performance as showing "excellent work rate and willingness". Kelly scored further goals against Inverness Caledonian Thistle (twice), St Mirren and Motherwell. In his first full season, Kelly made league 32 appearance along with 7 goals and provided 4 assists.

Later in the 2010–11 season, Paatelainen left the club to manage the Finland national team and was replaced by Kenny Shiels. In the 2011–12 season, Shiels played Kelly into the various position in midfield. On 18 March, Kelly played in the 2012 Scottish League Cup Final which Kilmarnock won after beating Celtic 1–0. Shortly before Kilmarnock were due to celebrate lifting the cup, Kelly's father suffered a heart attack next to the Kilmarnock dugout and the player left the ground to go to hospital with him. Kelly's father later died in hospital and his teammates, who had not been informed of the situation celebrated winning the trophy. They were informed as they presented the trophy to the fans in an open-top bus parade. Several players commented that this news had taken a lot of the joy of winning the cup final away, and that because they were a close group of players they all felt the effect of Kelly's loss. Manager Kenny Shiels was visibly upset and said "I'm sounding a bit sombre because I've gone from one emotional high to a low. It's tough to go from one of the best moments of our lives to this. The dressing-room is very despondent. We are really thinking more about Liam than our triumphalism." Shiels revealed he and the entire Kilmarnock squad would attend the funeral of Kelly's father Jack the following week in Kelly's home town of Milton Keynes. Kelly did not play for a while after the death of his dad. While not playing, many Kilmarnock players including Paul Heffernan, Gary Harkins and Dieter Van Tornhout wore a shirts saying "We Are All With You" in support of Kelly ahead of Kilmarnock's match against Motherwell which they won 2–0 thanks to a brace from Heffernan. Kelly made his return for Kilmarnock in a match against St Mirren coming on as a substitute for James Fowler in the 87th minute. Following this, both sets of fans gave Kelly a standing ovation given and both sets of fans were praised by Shiels. Kelly provided assist for Kenny Shiels's son Dean Shiels to score in a 89th minutes as Kilmarnock lost to St Mirren 4–2. After the match, St Mirren manager Danny Lennon expressed condolence for Kelly. On the final day of the season, Kelly scored his first goal of the season in a 2–1 win over Dunfermline Athletic.

The following season, Kelly maintained first team status in the first half of the season, having played all twenty two matches for Kilmarnock until leaving for Bristol City. Kelly, along with newly signed Cillian Sheridan, were on target as Kilmarnock won at Celtic Park for the first time since 1955, on 27 October 2012. After the match, Shiels praised Kelly performance's. Kelly, himself, says his teammates helped him to cope with his father death. Kelly soon added five more goals to his tally this season, including a brace in a 2–0 win over Aberdeen and a 1–0 win over Hearts. Kelly made his last appearance when he scored in a 1–1 draw against St Mirren on 2 January 2013. In December 2012, Kelly attracted the attention of clubs England and Scotland like West Ham United, Norwich City, Celtic and Derby County.

Bristol City
Kelly signed a three-and-a-half-year contract with Bristol City in January 2013, moving for an undisclosed fee. The manager who signed him, Derek McInnes, was sacked just two days later following Kelly's debut, a 4–0 home defeat to Leicester City. Kelly made 19 appearances for Bristol City in the 2012–13 season, but then suffered a cruciate ligament injury in July 2013. As a result of this injury, Kelly only made two appearances during the 2013–14 season.

Oldham Athletic

Kelly signed a three-year contract with Oldham Athletic on 27 June 2014 as part of the exchange to Korey Smith. Upon the move, Kelly said he was delighted to join Oldham Athletic and happy to link up with his teammate turned manager Lee Johnson and James Dayton. He was given number six shirt and was appointed as the new club captain. Kelly made his debut in the opening game of the season, a 2–2 draw against Colchester United. Oldham transferred Kelly to Leyton Orient for an undisclosed fee in July 2016.

Leyton Orient
Kelly signed a three-year contract for a fee believed to be a club record £210,000 for Leyton Orient in July 2016.

After Orient's 3–2 win in the League 2 match at Plymouth Argyle on 14 February 2017, Plymouth reported Kelly to the FA for allegedly pushing a ball boy to the floor during the match. Video footage showing Kelly pushing the ball boy to the ground was subsequently released. The FA charged Kelly with violent conduct, claiming that a three-match suspension would be "clearly insufficient". The player denied both the charge and the claim; however, following an Independent Regulatory Commission hearing on 17 February, the charge of violent conduct was found proven. The standard three-match ban was deemed insufficient and was doubled to a six-match ban. Kelly returned to the Orient starting line up for the 4–1 defeat at home to Doncaster Rovers on 18 March. At the end of the season Leyton Orient were relegated from League Two, ending their 112-year stay in the football league.

Coventry City 
On 22 May 2017 newly relegated Coventry City announced that they had agreed to sign Kelly on a two-year contract. He made 38 appearances in his first season, including starting the 2018 League Two Play-off Final, as Coventry secured promotion back to League One. After the end of the season, Kelly signed a new contract to keep him at Coventry until 2021. Following the departure of Michael Doyle in January 2019 he was named as the new club captain. Coventry finished their first season back in League One in 8th, 8 points behind the final play-off place. In 2019–20, his first full season as captain, Kelly led the team to 1st place in League One before the season was halted in March due to the COVID-19 pandemic. A formal vote by league members confirmed Coventry as league champions in June, meaning that they would be promoted back to the Championship.

International career
He was selected for the Scotland national under-21 football team to play Belgium on 24 March 2011. Kelly received his first Senior Scotland cap in November 2012, for a friendly against Luxembourg. Kelly made his international debut, coming on for Charlie Mulgrew early in a second half, in a 2–1 win.

Career statistics

Honours
Kilmarnock
Scottish League Cup: 2011–12

Coventry City
EFL League Two play-offs: 2018

EFL League One Champions: 2020

See also
 List of Scotland international footballers born outside Scotland

References

External links

1990 births
Living people
People from Newport Pagnell
People from Milton Keynes
English footballers
Scottish footballers
English people of Scottish descent
Scotland youth international footballers
Scotland under-21 international footballers
Scotland international footballers
Association football midfielders
Milton Keynes Dons F.C. players
Kilmarnock F.C. players
Bristol City F.C. players
Oldham Athletic A.F.C. players
Leyton Orient F.C. players
Coventry City F.C. players
Scottish Premier League players
English Football League players
Footballers from Buckinghamshire